Qiqiao may refer to:

Qixi Festival, also known as Qiqiao Festival
Qiqiao, Hebei (齐桥), a town in Botou, Hebei, China
Qiqiao Subdistrict (漆桥街道), a subdistrict of Gaochun District, Nanjing, Jiangsu, China